Parliamentary elections were held in Norway on 11 September 1961. The result was a victory for the Labour Party, which won 74 of the 150 seats in the Storting. Although it lost the absolute majority it had held since 1945, the Labour Party was able to continue in government.

Results

Seat distribution

Notes

References

General elections in Norway
1960s elections in Norway
Norway
Parliamentary
Norway